An airstair is a set of steps built into an aircraft so that passengers may board and alight the aircraft. The stairs are often built into a clamshell-style door on the aircraft. Airstairs eliminate the need for passengers to use a mobile stairway or jetway to board or exit the aircraft, providing more independence from ground services. Some of the earliest aircraft to feature airstairs were the Martin 2-0-2 and Martin 4-0-4. Some models of the Douglas DC-3 were also retrofitted with airstairs. As airport infrastructure has developed, the need for airstairs has decreased, as jetways or mobile stairways are often available.

Wide-body aircraft rarely employ airstairs, as the doors are significantly higher above the ground than narrow-body aircraft. One notable exception is the Lockheed L-1011, the only wide-body aircraft to feature full-height airstairs. The only other wide-bodies with airstairs, the VC-25 and the Ilyushin Il-86, have airstairs contained in the cargo hold, with steps inside the cabin to access these stairs.

Some aircraft, like the Boeing 727 and McDonnell Douglas DC-9, were designed to improve ground services, with passengers deplaning from the front as the aircraft is serviced from the rear, enabling quicker turnarounds.

Airstairs are also used as a security measure, for example on aircraft carrying the President of the United States, allowing the aircraft to be boarded by VIPs at any time - with or without the cooperation of ground services.

Design
Ventral airstairs are featured on most tail-engined airliners, such as the Boeing 727, the McDonnell Douglas DC-9, MD-80 and MD-90, the BAC 1-11, and the Yakovlev Yak-40/Yak-42 series, and are incorporated as ramps which lower from the fuselage. The Ilyushin Il-86 has three airstairs on the port side.

The most common type of airstair is found in most business aircraft, regional jets, and other small airliners, which is a stair built into the inside of the main passenger door, which is lowered to the outside. Aircraft such as the Fokker F-28 series and the VFW-Fokker 614 made this design popular. The stairs are actually part of the door rather than an attached stair. This design is efficient and because the aircraft which use it sit low to the ground, the design can stay simple and not add complexity or weight to the design, one of the biggest problems with airstair assemblies.  The design has also been used with a single-length set of extension stairs on aircraft such as the cargo compartment of the widebody Ilyushin Il-86 (the primary entrance to the aircraft for passengers), Boeing VC-25, and the belly lounges of three Lockheed L-1011s.

Another widespread type of airstair is used for forward doors.  The stair folds and stows under the floor of the door and is deployed from the fuselage immediately below the forward door.  This type of airstair is found on many short-range aircraft such as Boeing 737s, DC-9s, and some Airbus A320 series aircraft. The mechanism is also quite heavy; as a result, many airlines have removed this system to reduce aircraft weight.

A unique airstair design was used for the aft doors of 737 Combi aircraft, which consisted of a clamshell door which dropped down to open much like a business aircraft, but then had stairs which were stored trifold in the curve of the door, which would unfold to the ground.  This system was very cumbersome, was very susceptible to damage, and thus has been removed by many of its users.

The most unusual airstair design was found on the Lockheed L-1011, which was a full-height airstair that was stored in a cargo compartment and allowed access from the right aft passenger door to the ground.  This design was ultimately so large and heavy, and it took up valuable cargo space, that it was rarely used.

The original On-Board Folding Airstairs were designed by Winters Aircraft Engineering Company over 30 years ago. Airweld Incorporated is the current STC holder and has FAA PMA for all of the original STC's issued to Winters, as well as STC's issued to subsequent manufactures including Kaiser Aerospace, WAPCO, and Advanced Aerospace.  The On-Board Folding Airstairs can be found in use on many U.S. and Foreign Military and Government Aircraft including the Boeing E4B as well as VIP aircraft around the world. The On-Board Folding Airstairs is a multi-section (3, 4, or 5 segment) airstair that can be installed at either the forward, center, or aft doors. When retracted/closed, the airstair sits on a track and is typically stowed in a closet either Forward, Aft, or Transverse.

As a parachuting exit

A rear, ventral, airstair can be used as a safe means of parachuting from an airliner that is equipped with one. This was attempted on 24 November 1971 by an unknown hijacker, widely known as D. B. Cooper, who jumped from a Boeing 727 along with US$200,000 in ransom money.
However, it is unknown if he survived the jump. Subsequently, a number of individuals carried out copycat hijackings against Boeing 727s and safely parachuted to the ground, although all were apprehended by the authorities. To prevent this, Boeing 727s were ordered to be fitted with a simple device known as a Cooper vane that prevented the ventral airstair from being opened in flight.

The rear airstair of a DC-9 has been used to allow for recreational skydiving operations.

During the 2012 Boeing 727 crash experiment, a flight crew took off in the Boeing 727 that was to be crashed and flew it to a pre-selected desert site before safely parachuting from the airstair, as the Mexican government required that the plane be flown by a human crew for part of the experiment, especially as the aircraft's route to the crash site passed over populated areas. The 727 was then deliberately flown into the ground under remote control.

See also
 Jet bridge
 Evacuation slide

References

External links

 Period photographs of commercial airliners with lowered airstairs, from the Ed Coates collection:
 Douglas DC-3 of Southwest Airways (second photograph on the page)
 Martin 2-0-2, Martin 4-0-4 of Pacific Air Lines
 The Airstair of Yakovlev Yak-42D Airliners.net

Aircraft components
Stairways
Vertical transport devices